The R357 road is a regional road in Ireland linking Athleague, County Roscommon and Blue Ball, County Offaly. It passes Ballinasloe, County Galway, crosses the River Shannon at Shannonbridge passes through  Cloughan, County Offaly and then through the cutaway peatlands of Boora Bog to Blue Ball where it terminates at the N52.

See also
Roads in Ireland
National primary road
National secondary road

References
Roads Act 1993 (Classification of Regional Roads) Order 2006 – Department of Transport

External links
Boora Bog

Regional roads in the Republic of Ireland
Roads in County Roscommon
Roads in County Galway
Roads in County Offaly